During the Yemeni civil war, Saudi Arabia led an Arab coalition of nine nations from the Middle East and parts of Africa in response to calls from the internationally recognized pro-Saudi president of Yemen Abdrabbuh Mansur Hadi for military support after he was ousted by the Houthi movement due to economic and political grievances, and fled to Saudi Arabia.

Nations such as the United Kingdom and the United States support the Saudi Arabian-led intervention in Yemen primarily through arms sales and technical assistance. France had also made recent military sales to Saudi Arabia. MSF emergency coordinator Karline Kleijer called the US, France and the UK part of the Saudi-led coalition, which imposed the weapons embargo and blocked all ships from entering Yemen with supplies. Human rights groups have criticized the countries for supplying arms, and accuse the coalition of using cluster munitions, which are banned in most countries. Oxfam pointed out that Germany, Iran, and Russia have also reportedly sold arms to the conflicting forces. Tariq Riebl, head of programmes in Yemen for Oxfam, said, "it's difficult to argue that a weapon sold to Saudi Arabia would not in some way be used in Yemen," or "if it's not used in Yemen it enables the country to use other weapons in Yemen." Amnesty International urged the US and the UK to stop supplying arms to Saudi Arabia and to the Saudi-led coalition.

It called on the international community, including the United States and United Kingdom to stop "providing arms that could be used in the conflict in Yemen". On August 3, 2019, a United Nations report said the US, UK and France may be complicit in committing war crimes in Yemen by selling weapons and providing support to the Saudi-led coalition which is using the deliberate starvation of civilians as a tactic of warfare.

Arab coalition

Allegations of Iranian involvement
The coalition accused Iran of militarily and financially supporting the Houthis. On 9 April US secretary of state John Kerry said there were "obviously supplies that have been coming from Iran", with "a number of flights every single week that have been flying in", and warned Iran to stop its alleged support of the Houthis. Iran denied these claims.

Anti-Houthi fighters defending Aden claimed they captured two officers in the Iranian Quds Force on 11 April, who had purportedly been serving as military advisers to the Houthi militias in the city. This claim was not repeated. Iran denied presence of any Iranian military force.

According to Michael Horton, an expert on Yemeni affairs, the notion that the Houthis are an Iranian proxy is "nonsense".

According to Agence France-Presse, a confidential report presented to the Security Council's Iran sanctions committee in April 2015 claimed that Iran had been shipping weapons to the Houthi rebels since between 2009 and 2013. The panel further noted the absence of reports of any weapon shipments since 2013.

On 2 May, Abdollahian said that Tehran would not let regional powers jeopardize its security interests.

According to American officials, Iran discouraged Houthi rebels from taking over the Yemeni capital in late 2014, casting further doubt on claims that the rebels were fighting a proxy war on behalf of Iran. A spokeswoman for the US National Security Council said that it remained the council's assessment that "Iran does not exert command and control over the Houthis in Yemen."

On 6 May, Iran's supreme leader, Ayatollah Ali Khamenei, said, "The Americans shamelessly support the killing of the Yemeni population, but they accuse Iran of interfering in that country and of sending weapons when Iran only seeks to provide medical and food aid."

In May 2019, Houthi militias launched two attacks to two pumping stations managed by Saudi Aramco. Anas AlHajji, an oil expert, said that such an attack is planned to damage the said pipelines as they replace the Strait of Hormuz's oil passages.

United States

In March 2015, President Barack Obama declared that he had authorized US forces to provide logistical and intelligence support to the Saudis in their military intervention in Yemen, establishing a "Joint Planning Cell" with Saudi Arabia. This includes aerial refueling permitting coalition aircraft more loitering time over Yemen, and permitting some coalition members to home base aircraft rather than relocate them to Saudi Arabia.

According to press reporting, many in US SOCOM reportedly favor Houthis, as they have been effective at combating al-Qaeda and recently ISIL, "something that hundreds of US drone strikes and large numbers of advisers to Yemen's military had failed to accomplish". According to a senior CENTCOM commander, "the reason the Saudis didn't inform us of their plans is that they knew we would have told them exactly what we think—that it was a bad idea." As Yemen expert Michael Horton puts it, the US had been "Iran's air force in Iraq", and "al-Qaeda's air force in Yemen". According to an Al Jazeera report, one reason for US support may be the diplomatic logic of tamping down SA's opposition to the Iranian nuclear deal by backing them. Another is the view among some US military commanders that countering Iran took strategic priority over combating Al-Qaeda and ISIL.

On 30 June, an HRW report stated that US-made bombs were being used in attacks indiscriminately targeting civilians and violating the laws of war. The report photographed "the remnants of an MK-83 air-dropped 1,000-pound bomb made in the US".

US Representative Ted Lieu has been publicly raising concerns over US support for Saudi-led war in Yemen. In March 2016, he sent a letter to Secretary of State John Kerry and Secretary of Defense Ash Carter. He wrote in the letter that the "apparent indiscriminate airstrikes on civilian targets in Yemen seem to suggest that either the coalition is grossly negligent in its targeting or is intentionally targeting innocent civilians". Following American concern about civilian casualties in the Saudi-led war in Yemen, the US military involvement is mostly ineffective due to coalition's airstrikes targeting civilians and hospitals.

In 2015, the United States deployed The Green Berets to assist the Saudi Arabian military with missile interception.

A March 2016 Human Rights Watch report states that US participation in specific military operations, such as selecting targets and aerial refueling during Saudi air raids "may make US forces jointly responsible for laws-of-war violations by coalition forces". In September The Guardian reported that one in three bombing raids hit civilian sites. 

On 13 October 2016,  fired Tomahawk missiles at Houthi-controlled radar sites "in the Dhubab district of Taiz province, a remote area overlooking the Bab al-Mandab Straight known for fishing and smuggling."

In 2017, the United States sent a total of $599,099,937 of foreign aid to Yemen despite being a supporter of the Saudi led military intervention.

US Secretary of Defense James Mattis asked President Donald Trump to remove restrictions on US military support for Saudi Arabia. In February 2017, Mattis wanted to intercept and board an Iranian ship in the Arabian Sea to look for contraband weapons, which would have constituted an "act of war". In April 2017, Justin Amash, Walter Jones and other members of Congress criticized US involvement in Saudi Arabian military campaign in Yemen, highlighting that Al Qaeda in Yemen "has emerged as a de facto ally of the Saudi-led militaries with whom [Trump] administration aims to partner more closely".

In November 2017, US Senator Chris Murphy accused the United States of complicity in Yemen's humanitarian catastrophe.

In December 2017, the Trump administration urged restraint in the Saudi military action in Yemen, as well as in Qatar and Lebanon.

US bombs used by the coalition have killed Yemeni civilians throughout 2018, including a Lockheed Martin made bomb that struck a school bus in August, killing 51 people.

In the wake of Jamal Khashoggi's murder in October 2018, the US Secretary of State Mike Pompeo and the US Secretary of Defense James Mattis have called for a ceasefire in Yemen within 30 days followed by UN-initiated peace talks. Pompeo has asked Saudi Arabia and the UAE to stop their airstrikes on populated areas in Yemen. President of the International Rescue Committee David Miliband called the US announcement as "the most significant breakthrough in the war in Yemen for four years". The US continues its support of the Saudi-led intervention with weapons sales and intelligence sharing. On 10 November 2018, the US announced it would no longer refuel coalition aircraft operating over Yemen. On 13 December, the US Senate voted to end US military assistance to Saudi Arabia over alleged war crimes in Yemen.

Following the 56-to-41 vote in the US Senate to invoke the War Powers Resolution and to end US military support to Saudi Arabia, the Pentagon presented a bill of $331 million to Saudis and Emiratis for US' support in the Yemen Civil War. The bill was split between $36.8 million for fuel and $294.3 million for US flight hours. The Pentagon stated that Saudi Arabia has not made any payments since the beginning of the war.

In April 2019, Trump vetoed a bipartisan bill which would have ended US support for the Saudi-led military intervention. With 53 votes instead of the 67 needed, the United States Senate failed to override the veto. The legal arguments and policies of the Obama administration were cited as justification for the veto.  The US Deputy Assistant Secretary of Defense Michael Mulroy stated that US support was limited to side-by-side coaching to mitigate civilian casualties and if the measure had passed it would do nothing to help the people of Yemen and may only increase civilian deaths. Mulroy supported the United Nation's peace talks and he pushed the international community to come together and chart a comprehensive way ahead for Yemen. Writing in The Nation, Mohamad Bazzi argued that Mulroy's defence of US support as necessary to limit civilian casualties was false, and that "Saudi leaders and their allies have ignored American entreaties to minimize civilian casualties since the war's early days".

In the August 2020 report issued by the Office of Inspector General, it is said that the State Department watchdog detected that Secretary of State Mike Pompeo declared an emergency for selling arms worth billions of dollars to Saudi Arabia, the United Arab Emirates and Jordan, in compliance with legal requirements. However, the risks posed to civilian lives Yemen, with relation to the arms sale, wasn't thoroughly assessed at the time of declaring the emergency, the report states. The report also cited that the State Department's frequent approval of arms sale to the Gulf states, Saudi and UAE, fell below the limits of AECA.

On February 4, 2021, the new US President Joe Biden announced an end to the U.S. support for Saudi-led operations in Yemen but has backtracked on that goal and is considering returning to the Trump administration's designation of the  Houthi rebels in Yemen as foreign terrorists. On June 8 2022, the Biden administration confirmed that United States military personal were deployed and conducting operations within Yemen.

As per the report published by Government Accountability Office (GAO) in June 2022, neither the Pentagon nor the State Department could show if they had properly investigated allegations that Saudi-led coalition used U.S.-provided military support to carry out airstrikes and other attacks that allegedly killed civilians in Yemen. Nearly $55 billion in weapons the U.S. has sold to Saudi Arabia and the United Arab Emirates between 2015 and 2021 had been improperly used to harm civilians in Yemen. The report also raised serious doubts about Joe Biden’s foreign policy ending US support for Saudi offensive operations in Yemen because the administration’s move to classify weapons as offensive or defensive was largely meaningless.

Analysis by Oxfam of data from January 2021 to February 2022 found that 431 airstrikes using U.S. or UK provided weapons resulted in at least 87 civilians killed and 136 wounded. Osfam stated 13 airstrikes had hit hospitals and clinics.

United Kingdom

The UK is one of the largest suppliers of arms to Saudi Arabia, and London immediately expressed strong support for the Saudi-led campaign. Six months into the bombing, Oxfam said the UK was "quietly fuelling the Yemen conflict and exacerbating one of the world's worst humanitarian crises" by keeping its arms pipeline to Saudi Arabia open; the Campaign Against Arms Trade (CAAT) agreed that "UK arms and UK cooperation have been central to the devastation of Yemen." In mid-September 2015, the deputy chief executive of Oxfam complained that the government even refused to reveal to Parliament the details of the 37 arms export licences it had granted for sales to Saudi Arabia since March that year. The attack on Yemen saw sales of UK bombs for 2015 increase from £9m to over £1bn in three months. Amnesty International and Human Rights Watch have shown that UK arms are being used on civilian targets. Furthermore, the UK government has been repeatedly accused of violating domestic, EU, and international law, in particular the Arms Trade Treaty, by maintaining its flow of weapons to the Kingdom.

Despite this, it was reported in November 2015 that the UK planned a number of high-level visits to Saudi Arabia over the following three to six months with the aim of securing major arms deals.

In January 2016, it emerged that UK military advisors were assisting Saudi personnel in the selection of targets. On 2 February 2016, the International Development Select Committee finally added its call for the UK to cease exporting arms to Saudi Arabia and to end its opposition to an independent international inquiry into the way the military campaign had been conducted thus far. The committee's call went unheeded; indeed, just weeks later, on the day the EU held a non-binding vote in favour of an arms embargo on the country because of its destructive bombing of Yemen, Prime Minister David Cameron boasted about the "brilliant" arms, components, and other military technology that the UK would continue to sell to Saudi Arabia, Oman, and other Gulf states.

Angus Robertson, the SNP's Parliamentary Group Leader, said David Cameron should admit to British involvement in Saudi Arabia's war in Yemen: "Isn't it time for the Prime Minister to admit that Britain is effectively taking part in a war in Yemen that is costing thousands of civilians lives and he has not sought parliamentary approval to do this?" A few months later, leading American security expert Bruce Riedel noted: "If the United States and the United Kingdom, tonight, told King Salman [of Saudi Arabia] 'this war has to end,' it would end tomorrow. The Royal Saudi Air Force cannot operate without American and British support."

As well as supplying materiel and targeting support for the bombing of Yemen, the UK has assisted the coalition diplomatically. For example, the UK response, provided by Middle East Minister Tobias Ellwood, to the leaked report of a UN panel in January 2016, which documented more than one hundred instances of coalition air strikes that had violated international law, was to say that the Saudis had made "mistakes" and claim that other cases may have been "fabricated" by the Houthis.

Theresa May succeeded David Cameron as prime minister in July 2016, but maintained her predecessor's policy because, she claimed, close ties with the Saudis "keep people on the streets of Britain safe". In September 2016, her foreign minister, Boris Johnson, refused to block UK arms sales to Saudi Arabia, saying there remained no clear evidence of breaches of international humanitarian law by Saudi Arabia in the war in Yemen, and that it would be best for Saudi Arabia to investigate itself. Amid reports from Yemen of famine conditions and "emaciated children [...] fighting for their lives", CAAT observed that the notion of self-investigation would rightly never pass muster if it were proposed for Russia's bombing in support of Assad in Syria. Indeed, in October 2016, Boris Johnson commended the notion of referring allegations of Russian and Russian-backed war crimes to the International Court of Justice. The previous month, Johnson had rejected a proposal for the UN Human Rights Council to conduct an inquiry into the war in Yemen. Furthermore, Britain blocked such an inquiry from taking place.  Foreign Office lawyer and whistleblower Molly Mulready claimed that Johnson was uninterested and "joked around" when briefed about war crimes committed with British weapons.

In October 2016, it emerged that the United Kingdom was continuing to provide instruction to pilots of the Royal Saudi Air Force, both in the UK and in Saudi Arabia.

Andrew Mitchell, the former cabinet minister in David Cameron's government, stated that "Britain is complicit in creating" a famine in Yemen.

Some British soldiers were involved in gun battles with, and been wounded by, Houthi fighters. At least five members of the SBS were wounded. An SBS source said, "The guys are fighting in the inhospitable desert and mountainous terrain against highly committed and well-equipped Houthi rebels, The SBS's role is mainly training and mentoring but on occasions, they have found themselves in firefights and some British troops have been shot". The report also claims that British Special Forces are fighting on the same side as jihadists and militia which use child soldiers. After the report, The shadow foreign secretary Emily Thornberry, questioned these allegations in the British parliament suggesting that the British forces may have been witnesses to war crimes, if the allegations were true. She claimed that as many as 40% of the soldiers in the Saudi coalition were children, a breach of international humanitarian law. In response, the UK Foreign Office minister Mark Field called the allegations "very serious and well sourced" and promised to get to the bottom of these allegations.

On 25 March 2019 Mark Lancaster told the UK parliament that Britain's Royal Air Force (RAF) was providing "engineering support" and "generic training" to Saudi Arabian military.

According to the Guardian News agency, more than 40 Saudi officers have been trained at prestigious British military colleges since the Saudi intervention in Yemen started. This officers mostly trained at Sandhurst, the RAF's school at Cranwell and the Royal Naval College in Dartmouth since 2015. The MoD refused to state the earned money from the Saudi contracts, because it could influence Britain's relations with the Saudis.

In April 2020, Campaign Against the Arms Trade (CAAT) analyzed the annual report of BAE Systems and revealed that Britain's leading arms manufacturer sold weapons worth £15bn to Saudi Arabia. CAAT also stated that supply of weapons continued during Riyadh's involvement in Yemen civil war, while BAE generated £2.5bn in revenues from the Saudi military in 2019.

Abdul-Malik Badreddin, The Houthi leader condemned the UK military cooperation and arms sales to Saudi military. According to a Sky News analysis, The UK has sold at least £5.7bn worth of arms to the Saudi-led coalition fighting in Yemen since 2015.

Priyanka Motaparthy, senior emergencies researcher at Human Rights Watch, said: “These revelations confirm once again how the UK military is working hand in glove with the Saudis.

On August 24, 2020, a British soldier, Ahmed Al-Babati was arrested for protesting outside the Ministry of Defence (MOD) in London, against arms sales to Saudi Arabia that were being used in the Yemen war. He accused the UK government of having ‘blood on their hands’.

On 27 October 2020, the Campaign Against Arms Trade (CAAT) decided to launch a judicial review into the UK's decision to renew selling arms to Saudi Arabia, which has been involved in the Yemen war. According to CAAT, the weapons sales to the Kingdom would further fuel destruction in Yemen, where thousands of civilians were asserted to have died because of the widespread bombing.

In January 2021, the UK government was reportedly put under pressure for not maintaining the record of a series of air strikes that took place in Yemen, involving civilian casualties, in the Ministry of Defence's confidential log of reported breaches of the IHL or International Humanitarian Law by the warring parties. The database, which had been maintained by the MoD since 2015, came under limelight after the UK arms manufacturers were involved in a legal challenge over export licenses provided to Saudi for sale of weapons used in Yemen. Saudi Arabia leads an Arab coalition that has been accused of causing the most number of human rights violations in the conflict. Reportedly, the weapons were claimed to be used in the breach of IHL. As per the questions raised in October 2020 by Emily Thornberry, a range of such airstrikes were identified as well as reported by the non-profit organization Yemen Data Project and not in the MoD database.

The anti-arms trade campaigners, CAAT reportedly won to challenge the UK government in the high court for its decision to resume arms sales to the Kingdom of Saudi Arabia, which is possibly used in the Yemen war. A complete hearing will be conducted in the coming months of 2021, which will renew the legal battle between the British government and the campaigning group. A similar battle previously led to halting the sales of arms to the Saudi government.

On 20 October 2021, a London based law firm, Guernica 37 filed a complaint to British police accusing senior government and military officials in Saudi Arabia and the UAE of conspiring in war crimes in Yemen. The dossier was submitted to London’s Metropolitan Police Service and the Crown Prosecution Service (CPS), calling for the individuals to be immediately arrested as soon as they enter the UK. Guernica 37’s legal team focused on three events, including a 2018 air attack on a school bus in northern Yemen that killed around 26 children, and a 2016 aerial bombing of a funeral in Sana'a that killed 140 people.

France
France is also a significant arms supplier to Saudi Arabia. It has supplied over 2 billion dollars including armored vehicles, air defense systems, and aircraft subsystems. France has also supplied the UAE with arms, despite the UAE and the militias it backs being implicated in war crimes and other serious violations. 
In late September 2021, two NGOs filed a legal case in the Paris administrative court ordering the French customs to disclose their records in order to investigate the war equipments exported to countries like the United Arab Emirates and Saudi Arabia, having involvement in the Yemen war. The case was filed after the French customs denied disclosing the required documentation in the probe of potential links to the sale of weaponry in Yemen war, as per ECCHR and Amnesty International France. Investigative media firm namely, Disclose was also one of the plaintiffs in the case.

Private military involvement
On 22 November 2015, The New York Times reported the United Arab Emirates had contracted Academi to deploy 450 Colombian, Panamanian, Salvadoran and Chilean mercenaries to Yemen in October.

On 9 December, Australian media reported an Australian mercenary commander was killed in Yemen alongside six Colombian nationals after Houthi fighters and Saleh army units attacked Saudi-led forces in the country's south-west.

Others
On 17 September 2020, a United Nations panel named Canada as one of the countries helping fuel the war in Yemen. A coalition of 39 human rights, arms-control and labor groups, including the Public Service Alliance of Canada, signed a letter urging Canadian Prime Minister Justin Trudeau to end arms exports to Saudi Arabia.

The Italian government announced suspending the sales of 12,700 missiles to the Saudi Arabian government along with UAE, which was initiated under the centre-left government led by Matteo Renzi. The missiles were part of a 2016 sales agreement made for the allotment of a total of 20,000 missiles, worth more than $485 million. The government cited its commitment towards the restoration of peace in Yemen and the protection of human rights as the reason for ending the weapons sale. Renzi stirred a controversy when he attended the Future Investment Initiative in Riyadh, Saudi Arabia, and called the country the vision of a “New Renaissance”.

See also

 Famine in Yemen
 Airstrikes on hospitals in Yemen
 Saudi Arabian-led intervention in Yemen
 United Arab Emirates takeover of Socotra
 Iran–Saudi Arabia proxy conflict

References

Yemeni Civil War (2014–present)
Yemeni Crisis (2011–present)
Foreign intervention
Foreign relations of Yemen
Military intervention in Yemen